Shiro was a restaurant in Ahakista, County Cork, Ireland. It was a fine dining restaurant that was awarded one Michelin star each year in the period 1996–2001. The Michelin Guide awarded the restaurant the "Red M", indicating 'good food at a reasonable price', in the period 1988–1995. The Egon Ronay Guide awarded the restaurant one star in the period 1988–1989.

The kitchen style was Japanese and Sushi.

The restaurant had only a short menu, no staff (the owners were also head chef and waiter), one seating a night and was located in a typical Irish Cottage.

Head chef of Shiro was the late Kei Pilz.

See also
List of Michelin starred restaurants in Ireland

References

Restaurants in the Republic of Ireland
County Cork
Defunct restaurants in Ireland
Michelin Guide starred restaurants in Ireland
Restaurants disestablished in 2001